Gabriela Golder is an Argentine artist and curator. She works primarily in experimental video art and audiovisual installation art. She received the Sigwart Blum award from the Argentinean Association of Art Critics (2007), the Media Art Award from the German Zentrum für Kunst und Medietechnologie (2003), the First Prize at the National Hall of Visual Art (2004), and the first prize at Videobrasil (2003). Her work is in the collection of the ZKM Center for Art and Media Karlsruhe. She won the Konex Award from Argentina in 2022.

References

Argentine art curators
Living people
Artists from Buenos Aires
Women video artists
Women installation artists
21st-century Argentine women artists
21st-century Argentine artists
Argentine curators
Argentine women curators
Year of birth missing (living people)